Thomas Bowman Brewer (born July 22, 1932) was the sixth chancellor of East Carolina University, serving in that position from 1978 to 1982.  He was born in Fort Worth, Texas and went to the University of Texas at Austin and received his B.A. and M.A.  Brewer earned his Ph.D. from the University of Pennsylvania concentrating on American history. Before assuming the position of chancellor of ECU on July 1, 1978, Brewer was a Dean at Texas Christian University and a department chairman at the University of Toledo.

He was general editor of the MacMillan Company's "Railroads of America" series.

References

External links 
Brewer biography

1932 births
Living people
People from Fort Worth, Texas
Presidents of East Carolina University